Jeremiah J. Hamilton (July 1, 1838 - 1905) was a school founder, carpenter, political organizer, and legislator in Texas.

He was born a slave July 1, 1838 in Tennessee then taken to Texas in 1847.

He served as the secretary of the Texas State Central Committee of Colored Men in March 1866.

In the summer of 1866 he founded a school for black students of all ages in Bastrop, Texas.

A Republican, he served as a Representative in the 12th Legislature, for Fayette County, Texas and Bastrop County from February 9, 1870, to January 14, 1873.

In 1871 he built the triangular Hamilton House at Symphony Square Red River, an extant building in Austin Symphony Orchestra's Symphony Square.

See also
African-American officeholders during and following the Reconstruction era

References

External links 
 Photo circa 1870

1838 births
1905 deaths
African-American politicians during the Reconstruction Era
Radical Republicans
Founders of schools in the United States
19th-century American politicians
Republican Party members of the Texas House of Representatives
American former slaves
People from Bastrop, Texas
20th-century African-American people